Donna Lasinski (born November 3, 1968) is an American politician who has served in the Michigan House of Representatives from the 52nd district since 2017.

References

1968 births
21st-century American politicians
21st-century American women politicians
Democratic Party members of the Michigan House of Representatives
Living people
Ross School of Business alumni
Women state legislators in Michigan